Reading is a town in Windsor County, Vermont, United States. The population was 687 at the 2020 census.

History
On August 30, 1754, after being captured by Abenakis at Fort at Number 4, Charlestown, New Hampshire, and being force-marched to Montreal, Susannah Willard Johnson gave birth to a daughter about  up Knapp Brook. A marker beside Vermont Route 106 commemorates this event.

Geography
According to the United States Census Bureau, the town has a total area of 41.7 square miles (107.9 km2), of which 41.5 square miles (107.5 km2) is land and 0.2 square mile (0.4 km2) (0.41%) is water.

Landmarks
Reading is the home of Jenne Farm, a tourist attraction that draws in many photographers and other visitors, especially in the autumn.

Demographics

As of the census of 2010, there were 666 people, 290 households, and 192 families residing in the town. The racial makeup of the town was 99.1% White, 0.0% African American, 0.3% Asian, and 0.6% from two or more races. Hispanic or Latino of any race were 0.6% of the population.

There were 290 households, out of which 24.8% had children under the age of 18 living with them, 54.1% were married couples living together, 9.3% had a female householder with no husband present, 2.8% had a male householder with no wife present, and 33.8% were non-families. 25.50% of all households were made up of individuals, and 11.3% had someone living alone who was 65 years of age or older. The average household size was 2.30 and the average family size was 2.70.

In the town, the population was spread out, with 20.8% age 19 or under, 3.8% from 20 to 24, 20.0% from 25 to 44, 36.1% from 45 to 64, and 19.7% who were 65 years of age or older. The median age was 47.9 years. For every 100 females, there were 94.7 males. For every 100 females age 18 and over, there were 97.4 males.

The median income for a household in the town was $58,667, and the median income for a family was $67,250. Males had a median income of $38,750 versus $29,219 for females. The per capita income for the town was $28,950. About 1.05% of families and 8.8% of the population were below the poverty line, including 12.1% of those under age 18 and 3.7% of those age 65 or over.

Education and Municipal services

Reading is served by Reading Elementary School for Grades Pre-K–6.  In 2017–2018, there were a total of 60 students.  Student attend grades 7–12 at Woodstock Union High and Middle School. This school is part of the Windsor Central Unified District as of July 1, 2018, as part of Vermont Act 46 changes.

Notable people
 Titus Brown, US congressman
Christian William Miller, artist, model, and inventor of a pocket-sized water desalination device
Daphne Zuniga, actress

References

External links

 Town of Reading official website

 
Towns in Vermont
Towns in Windsor County, Vermont